The 1996 Cairns Cyclones season was the first season that the Cairns Cyclones rugby league team competed in the inaugural Queensland Cup. The Queensland Cup was formed after the Winfield State League was closed after the end of the 1995 Season. At the time the Queensland Cup was the second tier competition under the Brisbane Rugby League.

The Cairns Cyclones team was managed by Nigel Tillett and coached by Gary Smith. They were one of sixteen clubs competing in the fifteen-week-long competition, which included two split rounds. The 'Final 6' system was used in the Finals Series to determine the Premiers.

1996 Cairns Cyclones Squad 
1. Shannon Van Balen (Fullback)
2. Richard Murgha (Threequarters)
3. Mick Skardon (Threequarters)
4. Craig Cygler (Threequarters)
5. Chris Kelly (Threequarters)
6. Paul Fowler (Halves)
7. Robbie Schmidt (captain) (Halves)
8. Troy Lorimer (Forwards)
9. Andy Henley (Forwards)
10. Peter Deaves (Forwards)
11. Brian Fourmile (Forwards)
12. Matt Clifford (Forwards)
13. Matt Hensler (Forwards)
14. Chad Prien (Replacements)
15. John Clifford (Replacements)
16. Robbie Hollingsworth (Replacements)
17. Scott Tronc (Replacements)

Other players
David Maiden
Steve Womal
Steve Howlett
Nathan Woods
Chris Vanoletti

Best and Fairest Player Award
Cairns Cyclone's Robbie Schmidt was awarded The Courier Mail Best and Fairest player. The award was given to the Queensland Cup player voted for as the best and fairest over the entire season. After each game, the referees vote to award three votes to the best player, two votes to the second-best player, and one vote to the third-best player.

1996 Channel Nine Cup

1996 Ladder

 1Awarded One Point due to Game being Cancelled.

1996 Channel Nine Cup Minor Premiers and Premiers
 Minor Premiers:  Toowoomba Clydesdales
 Premiers:  Toowoomba Clydesdales

1996 Cairns Cyclones Matches

Rugby league in Queensland